Kerstin Köppen (later Köppen-Kosbab now Holtmeyer, born 24 November 1967 in Rathenow, Bezirk Potsdam) is a former German rower and Olympic champion. She is a two-time Olympic gold medallist, winning in 1992 and 1996. In addition, she has also won 5 Gold Medals in the Quadruple Sculls event at the World Championships beginning with Lake Barrington, Tasmania in 1990 whilst representing the former East Germany and a further four times for the re-unified Germany. She is married to Ralf Holtmeyer who coaches the German eight.

References

1967 births
Living people
People from Rathenow
People from Bezirk Potsdam
German female rowers
Sportspeople from Brandenburg
Olympic rowers of Germany
Rowers at the 1992 Summer Olympics
Rowers at the 1996 Summer Olympics
Olympic gold medalists for Germany
Olympic medalists in rowing
Medalists at the 1996 Summer Olympics
Medalists at the 1992 Summer Olympics
World Rowing Championships medalists for East Germany
World Rowing Championships medalists for Germany
Thomas Keller Medal recipients
Recipients of the Silver Laurel Leaf
20th-century German women